was a Japanese professional baseball player. A right-handed pitcher, he played in Japan for the Nishitetsu Lions. Ikenaga was one of the top pitchers in Nippon Professional Baseball before a scandal derailed his career at age 23. Before being implicated in the Black Mist Scandal, he made five consecutive All-Star teams at the beginning of his career, and was in the top 10 in ERA every season of his career.

Biography 
Ikenaga attended Shimonoseki Shogyo High School, with his school baseball team winning the spring 1963 Koshien Tournament.

He made his debut for the Nishitetsu Lions in 1965 at age 18, winning 20 games (3rd in the league) with a 2.27 ERA (5th in the league), and establishing himself as the team's ace. That year he made the Pacific League (PL) All-Star team, and was named the PL Rookie of the Year.

In 1966 he posted a 15–14 record with a 2.18 ERA, again fifth in the PL.

1967 was Ikenaga's most productive season, as he went 23–14 with a 2.31 ERA. He led the PL in wins, complete games (19), shutouts (6) and innings pitched (335-1/3).

1968 saw Ikenaga go 23–13, with a 2.45 ERA (3rd in the PL). The 1969 season saw Ikenaga post an 18–11 record and a 2.57 ERA, finishing 3rd in the league in wins.

Black Mist scandal 

In 1970 Ikenaga started the season 4–3 with a 2.60 ERA.

On April 1 of that year, disgraced former Lions pitcher Masayuki Nagayasu gave an exclusive tape-recorded interview to the Shūkan Post newspaper that revealed other players on his former team were also involved in game-fixing during the 1969 season. Of the seven players summoned by the league to testify on their involvement, one of them was Ikenaga. Ikenaga admitted taking money from gamblers via fellow pitcher Tsutomu Tanaka of the Chunichi Dragons (a former teammate — Tanaka pitched for Nishitetsu from 1961–1967), but said he did not let it affect his play. (Nonetheless, he did not return the 1 million yen he had received from Tanaka.)

On May 25, the NPB commissioner committee banned Ikenaga for life. Ikenaga's banning was fiercely contested by both Nishitetsu's front office and Ikenaga's own family. He finished his NPB career with a 103–65 record and a 2.36 ERA.

Reinstatement 
Ikenaga's case was not taken up by NPB until March 2005, when commissioner Yasuchika Negoro and owners agreed on a bylaw that allowed banned players who have reformed themselves to petition for a removal of the ban.  This occurred after a nine-year campaign by baseball fans and residents of his hometown.

Ikenaga requested a removal soon afterwards, and on April 25, 2005, he was allowed to return to baseball.

In popular culture 
The character Hidehiko Hayakawa in the 1998 anime series Princess Nine is based on Ikenaga.

See also 
 Black Sox Scandal
 Pete Rose

References

External links 
 Career statistics and player information from Baseball-Reference

1946 births
2022 deaths
Japanese baseball players
Nishitetsu Lions players
Seibu Lions players
People from Shimonoseki